Election for the Twelfth Legislative Assembly was held in the Indian state of Manipur from 28 February to 5 March 2022 in two phases, to elect 60 members of the Manipur Legislative Assembly. The result of the 2022 Manipur Legislative Assembly election was declared on 10 March 2022.

The previous assembly, 11th Manipur Legislative Assembly was dissolved in March 2022. The dissolution was necessitated after the results of the election was declared on 10 March. The tenure of 11th Manipur Legislative Assembly was scheduled to end on 19 March 2022.

Leaders

Composition

By alliance and party

By constituency 
Members of Legislative Assembly

References 

12th
2022 establishments in Manipur
2022
Manipur